DYPT-TV (channel 11) is a television station in Metro Cebu, Philippines, serving as the Visayas flagship of the government-owned People's Television Network. The station maintains hybrid analog/digital transmitting facility at Sitio Babag, Brgy. Busay, Cebu City.

History
September 11, 1963 - PTV began its broadcasts in Cebu via Channel 11, a frequency originally owned by Associated Broadcasting Corporation (now TV5 Network, Inc.), with the call sign DYMT-TV until President of the Philippines Ferdinand Marcos declared Martial Law on September 21, 1972.
February 2, 1974 - During the Martial Law era, the station reopened as DYGT-TV and became an owned-and-operated station of the National Media Production Center as Government Television (GTV) under Lito Gorospe and later by then-Press Secretary Francisco Tatad. It was the first television station in Central Visayas.
1978 - DYGT-TV switched affiliation to Banahaw Broadcasting Corporation, with its new call sign DYCW-TV. On the same year, GTV was transferred to Channel 3 under the call sign DYCB-TV, then was renamed  Maharlika Broadcasting System (MBS) in 1980.
February 24, 1986 - The station was officially rebranded as People's Television (PTV).
1988 - PTV returned to Channel 11, with Channel 3 being taken over by ABS-CBN. Its call letters were changed to DYPT-TV. Back then, its original studios were located at the former NMPC Bldg. along A.C. Cortes Ave., Mandaue (now demolished in 2011).
January 15, 2011 - The station suddenly went off the air for facility upgrades.
August 29, 2015 - PTV-11 Cebu resumed its operations, with the 10,000-watt brand new transmitter from the Advanced Broadcasting Electronics (ABE) Elettronica of Italy, complemented by a 250-foot tower in Sitio Babag, Barangay Busay, Cebu City, coinciding with the conduct of the APEC Summit in the city.
June 1, 2018 - PTV Cebu started its ISDB-T digital test broadcasts on UHF Channel 42.
December 16, 2021 - PTV Cebu went off the air for the second time following the effects of Typhoon Rai (Odette) in Cebu, Bohol and Leyte, causing the transmitter was struck brought by the said typhoon.
January 2022 - The station returned on-air after power was restored in Brgy. Babag.

Digital television

Digital channels

DYPT-TV broadcasts its digital signal on UHF Channel 42 (641.143 MHz) and is multiplexed into the following subchannels:

See also
People's Television Network
List of People's Television Network stations and channels
DWGT-TV - the network's flagship station in Manila.
DYMR

External links
Radio and TV broadcast stations of Region VII: Cebu province, National Telecommunications Commission (Philippines)

References

Digital television stations in the Philippines
Television channels and stations established in 1963
Television stations in Cebu City
People's Television Network stations